Taveirosaurus (tah-VAY-roo-SAWR-us) (meaning "Taveiro lizard") is a genus of ornithischian dinosaur that lived in Europe during the Late Cretaceous. The genus is based solely on teeth.

From 1968 Miguel Telles Antunes and Giuseppe Manuppella uncovered fossils at the Cerâmica do Mondego quarry near Taveiro, a village in Portugal, southwest of Coimbra. Among them were a number of low triangular teeth of a herbivorous dinosaur. In 1991 these were named and described by Telles Antunes and Denise Sigogneau-Russell as the type species Taveirosaurus costai. The generic name refers to Taveiro. The specific name honours the Portuguese geologist João Carrington da Costa.

The holotype, CEGUNL-TV 10, was found in ancient river clay of the Argilas de Aveiro Formation dating from the Maastrichtian. It consists of one tooth. Nine other teeth were also assigned to the genus, CEGUNL-TV 6–9, 11 and 13–16. Later also some teeth found near Laño in Spain were referred.

Having only the teeth to base themselves on, Telles Antunes and Sigogneau originally thought that Taveirosaurus belonged to some pachycephalosaurian group. In 1991 they assigned it to the Homalocephalidae, in 1992 to the Pachycephalosauridae. However, they soon rejected this possibility — and Taveirosaurus has not been included in this group in recent reviews — in 1995 considering it a member of the Nodosauridae. In 1996 Peter Galton suggested it might have belonged to the Fabrosauridae, pointing out a similarity to the teeth of Alocodon and Trimucrodon, two other "tooth genera". In 2004 David B. Norman concluded it was a nomen dubium.

References

External links 
 Dinosauria Translation and Pronunciation Guide

Ornithischian genera
Maastrichtian life
Late Cretaceous dinosaurs of Europe
Cretaceous Portugal
Fossils of Portugal
Fossil taxa described in 1991
Nomina dubia